Ali Benomar (born 9 May 1988) is a Dutch footballer who plays as a midfielder for amateur side Nieuwerkerk.

Club career
Born in Rotterdam to Moroccan parents, Benomar played professionally for NAC Breda, making his debut against FC Twente in a February 2009 Eredivisie match.

He moved into amateur football to play for IFC Ambacht and joined Nieuwerkerk in summer 2012.

References

External links
 Voetbal International

1988 births
Living people
Footballers from Rotterdam
Dutch sportspeople of Moroccan descent
Association football midfielders
Dutch footballers
NAC Breda players
Eredivisie players
Ido's Football Club players